Phyllis Lightbourn-Jones (born 8 August 1928) is a Bermudian former sprinter. She competed in the women's 100 metres, 200 metres and long jump at the 1948 Summer Olympics. She was the first woman to represent Bermuda at the Olympics.

References

1928 births
Living people
Athletes (track and field) at the 1948 Summer Olympics
Athletes (track and field) at the 1952 Summer Olympics
Bermudian female sprinters
Bermudian female long jumpers
Olympic athletes of Bermuda
Place of birth missing (living people)